Twin Shadow is the fifth studio album by Dominican-American singer-songwriter George Lewis Jr., under his stage name Twin Shadow. It was released on July 9, 2021, on Lewis's own label, Cheree Cheree. According to a press release quoted by Paste magazine, the self-titled album "represents Lewis' biggest sonic shift to date and finds the artist reexamining the cherished sounds of the golden era of soul and punk that were part of his musical upbringing and embracing his Dominican heritage, recording portions of the album at FAMA Studios in the Dominican Republic".

Track listing

"Alemania" – 3:55
"Sugarcane" – 3:30
"Johnny & Jonnie" – 2:49
"Get Closer" – 3:21
"Is There Any Love" – 3:27
"Gated Windows" – 3:20
"Modern Man" – 2:31
"Lonestar" – 2:45
"Brown Sugar" – 2:35
"I Wanna Be Here (Shotgun)" – 2:44

References

2021 albums
Twin Shadow albums